The 2010–11 season was the 10th season of the Liga ABA and 14 teams from Serbia, Slovenia, Montenegro, Croatia, Bosnia and Herzegovina and Czech Republic participated in it. It was only time that team from Czech Republic, Nymburk took part in this regional league, and second time since formation that team that is not from former Yugoslavia took part in league.

2010–11 NLB League Final Four was held on 19–21 April in Arena Stožice, Ljubljana.

Team information

Venues and locations

Head coaches

Coaching changes

Regular season 
The regular season began on Friday, 8 October 2010, and will end on Tuesday, 15 March 2011.

Standings

Schedule and results

Stats leaders

Points

Rebounds

Assists

Ranking MVP

MVP Round by Round 
{| class="wikitable sortable" style="text-align: center;"
|-
! align="center"|Round
! align="center"|Player
! align="center"|Team
! align="center"|Efficiency
|-
|1||align="left"| Milan Mačvan||align="left"| Hemofarm||33
|-
|2||align="left"| Bojan Bogdanović||align="left"| Cibona||29
|-
|3||align="left"| Michael Lee ||align="left"| Radnički||34
|-
|4||align="left"| Bojan Bogdanović(2) ||align="left"| Cibona||39
|-
|5||align="left"| Dontaye Draper||align="left"| Cedevita||38
|-
|6||align="left"| Milan Mačvan (2)||align="left"| Hemofarm||33
|-
|7||align="left"| Čedomir Vitkovac||align="left"| Igokea||28
|-
|8||align="left"| Luka Žorić||align="left"| Zagreb||42
|-
|9||align="left"| Michael Lee (2)||align="left"| Radnički||31
|-
|10||align="left"| Michael Lee (3)||align="left"| Radnički||34
|-
|11||align="left"| Steven Marković||align="left"| Radnički||38
|-
|12||align="left"| Luka Žorić (2)||align="left"| Zagreb||39
|-
|13||align="left"| Corsley Edwards||align="left"| Cedevita||38
|-
|14||align="left"| Marko Car||align="left"| Zadar||36
|-
|15||align="left"| Chester Simmons||align="left"| Nymburk||33
|-
|16||align="left"| Corsley Edwards (2)||align="left"| Cedevita||48
|-
|17||align="left"| Boris Savović||align="left"| Hemofarm||44
|-
|18||align="left"| Luka Žorić (3)||align="left"| Zagreb||31
|-
|19||align="left"| Vladan Vukosavljević||align="left"| Radnički||31
|-
|20||align="left"| Bracey Wright||align="left"| Cedevita||40
|-
|21||align="left"| Luka Žorić (4)||align="left"| Zagreb||35
|-
|22||align="left"| Luka Žorić (5)||align="left"| Zagreb||37
|-
|23||align="left"| Luka Žorić (6)||align="left"| Zagreb||40
|-
|24||align="left"| Mario Kasun||align="left"| Zagreb||36
|-
|25||align="left"| Vladimir Dragičević||align="left"| Budućnost||33
|-
|26||align="left"| Mario Kasun (2)||align="left"| Zagreb||36
|-
|Semifinals||align="left"| Zoran Dragić||align="left"| Krka||18
|-
|Final||align="left"| Nathan Jawai||align="left"| Partizan||19
|-

Final four 
Matches in, Arena Stožice, Ljubljana, Slovenia

Semifinals

Final

References

External links 
 adriaticbasket.info

2010-11
2010–11 in European basketball leagues
2010–11 in Serbian basketball
2010–11 in Slovenian basketball
2010–11 in Croatian basketball
2010–11 in Bosnia and Herzegovina basketball
2010–11 in Montenegrin basketball
2010–11 in Czech basketball